| tries = {{#expr:
+ 9 + 3 + 4 + 3 + 5 + 5
+ 5 + 2 + 9 + 6 + 5 + 6
+ 4 + 7 + 8 + 3 + 13 + 2
 + 8 + 3 + 3 + 4 + 9 + 5
 + 6 + 3 + 7 + 3 + 9 + 2
 + 4 + 7 + 2 + 5 + 5 + 5
 + 4 + 4 + 7 + 5 + 6 + 2
 + 2 + 3 + 6 + 7 + 4 + 2
 + 3 + 11 + 8 + 4 + 4 + 4
 + 4 + 2 + 6 + 2 + 2 +10
 + 4 + 6 + 3 + 8 + 5 + 6
 + 3 + 1 + 1 + 8 + 6 + 4
 + 10 + 5 + 6 + 2 + 4 + 6
 + 6 + 7 + 7 + 10 + 5 + 3
 + 5 + 3 + 10 + 11 + 11 + 7
 + 5 + 7 + 5 + 5 + 8 + 2
 + 6 + 6 + 4 + 7 + 8 + 9
 + 5 + 5 + 8 + 6 + 10 + 9
 + 9 + 3 + 5 + 9 + 5 + 9
 + 8 + 9 + 4 + 4 + 9 + 5
 + 3 + 3 + 8 + 7 + 4 + 9
 + 9 + 7 + 5 + 6 + 7 + 4
 + 4 + 4
 + 4
}}
| top point scorer = Jimmy Gopperth (Wasps)(292 points)
| top try scorer = Christian Wade (Wasps)(17 tries)
| website    = www.premiershiprugby.com
| prevseason = 2015–16
| nextseason = 2017–18
}}

The 2016–17 Aviva Premiership was the 30th season of the top flight English domestic rugby union competition and the seventh one to be sponsored by Aviva. The reigning champions entering the season were Saracens, who had claimed their third title after defeating Exeter Chiefs in the 2016 final. Bristol Bears had been promoted as champions from the 2015–16 RFU Championship after a seven year absence.

The competition was broadcast by BT Sport for the fourth successive season. Highlights of each weekend's games were shown for the final time on ITV with extended highlights on BT Sport.

Summary
Exeter Chiefs won their first title after defeating Wasps in the final at Twickenham after having finished second in the regular season table. Bristol Bears were relegated with two games of the season remaining. It was the fourth time that Bristol have been relegated from the top flight since the leagues began and the first time since the 2008–09 Premiership Rugby season.

As usual, round 1 included the London Double Header at Twickenham, the thirteenth instance since its inception in 2004.

Teams
Twelve teams compete in the league – the top eleven teams from the previous season and Bristol Bears who were promoted from the 2015–16 RFU Championship after a top flight absence of seven years. They replaced London Irish who were relegated after twenty years in the top flight.

Stadiums and locations

Pre-season
The 2016 Singha Premiership Rugby Sevens was held in July and August. Once again, the four Welsh Regions contested as a group, alongside the twelve Premiership clubs, which were split into three groups. The top two sides from each group contested the series final at the Ricoh Arena on 6 August.

Table

Regular season
Fixtures for the season were announced by Premiership Rugby on 7 July 2016. As is the norm, round 1 included the London Double Header at Twickenham. For the first time since its 2004 inception, the Double Header involved only two of the original London teams - Harlequins and Saracens - with London Irish having been relegated to the Championship for 2016-17 and Wasps no longer being based near London. Unlike the previous year, no games would take place abroad. All fixtures are subject to change.

Round 1

Round 2

Round 3

Round 4

Round 5

Round 6

Round 7

Round 8

Round 9

Round 10

Round 11

Round 12

Round 13

Round 14

Round 15

Round 16

Round 17

Round 18

Round 19

Round 20

Bristol are relegated providing the 2016–17 RFU Championship winners meet the minimum standards criteria.

Round 21

Round 22

Play-offs
As in previous seasons, the top four teams in the Premiership table, following the conclusion of the regular season, contest the play-off semi-finals in a 1st vs 4th and 2nd vs 3rd format, with the higher ranking team having home advantage. The two winners of the semi-finals then meet in the Premiership Final at Twickenham on 27 May 2017.

Bracket

Semi-finals

Final

Leading scorers
Note: Flags indicate national union as has been defined under WR eligibility rules. Players may hold more than one non-WR nationality.

Most points

Source:

Most tries

Source:

Attendances

By club
 Attendances do not include the final at Twickenham. The figures on the left hand side include marquee games (Big Game, The Clash, etc.), the attendances for which are in bold.

Notes

References

External links
 

 
2016-17
 
England